The Teslui is a right tributary of the river Olt in Romania. It discharges into the Olt in Fărcașele.

References

Rivers of Romania
Rivers of Olt County
Rivers of Dolj County